The 1951 Irish general election to the 14th Dáil was held on Wednesday, 30 May following the dissolution of the 13th Dáil on 7 May by President Seán T. O'Kelly on the request of Taoiseach John A. Costello. The general election took place in 40 Dáil constituencies throughout Ireland for 147 seats in Dáil Éireann, the house of representatives of the Oireachtas.

This election was the first election since the declaration of the Republic of Ireland on 18 April 1949 under the terms of The Republic of Ireland Act 1948, which automatically forced Ireland's withdrawal from the British Commonwealth.

The 14th Dáil met at Leinster House on 13 June to nominate the Taoiseach for appointment by the president and to approve the appointment of a new government of Ireland. Costello failed to secure a majority, and Éamon de Valera was appointed Taoiseach, forming the 6th Government of Ireland, a single-party minority Fianna Fáil government.

Campaign

The 1951 general election was caused by a number of crises within the First Inter-Party Government, most notably the Mother and Child Scheme. While the whole affair – which saw the resignation of the Minister for Health, Noël Browne – was not entirely to blame for the collapse of the government, it added to the disagreement between the various political parties. There were other problems facing the country, such as rising prices and balance-of-payments problems. Two farmer TDs withdrew their support for the government because of rising milk prices.

Although the First Inter-Party Government had come to an end, it had a number of achievements. It proved that the country could be led by a group other than Fianna Fáil. It also provided a fresh perspective after sixteen years of government by a single party.

The coalition parties fought the general election on their record over the previous three years, while Fianna Fáil argued strongly against coalition governments.

Result

|}

Voting summary

Seats summary

Government formation
The election result was inconclusive. Fianna Fáil's support increased by 61,000 votes; however, the party only gained one additional seat. The coalition parties had mixed fortunes. Fine Gael were the big winners increasing to forty seats. The Labour Party had reunited in 1950, when the National Labour Party had merged back into the party but in spite of this, the party lost seats. Clann na Poblachta was the big loser of the election. Three years earlier the party had been a big political threat but now the party was shattered.

Fianna Fáil did not enough seats to govern alone. However, the party was able to form a minority government with the support of Noel Browne, the sacked Minister for Health, and other Independent deputies.

Changes in membership

First-time TDs

Philip Brady
Joseph Brennan
Patrick Cawley
Declan Costello
Patrick Crowe
Liam Cunningham
Percy Dockrell
Peadar Duignan
Anthony Esmonde
John Fanning
Michael ffrench-O'Carroll
Seán Flanagan
Colm Gallagher
James Hession
Patrick Hillery
John Lynch
Peadar Maher
John Mannion Snr
Michael Pat Murphy
William Murphy
Denis J. O'Sullivan

Re-elected TDs
Laurence Walsh

Outgoing TDs
Sir John Esmonde (retired)
Mick Fitzpatrick (lost seat)
John Friel (lost seat)
Patrick Gorry (lost seat)
James Kilroy (lost seat)
Michael Lydon (lost seat)
Michael Óg McFadden (lost seat)
Joseph Mongan (deceased)
Martin O'Sullivan (lost seat)
Robert Ryan (lost seat)
Richard Walsh (retired)

Notes

References

1951 elections in Europe
General election, 1951
1951
14th Dáil
General election
May 1951 events in Europe